Peter Darke (born 21 December 1953) was an English footballer who played as a full back.

He began his career as an apprentice with Plymouth Argyle, having been spotted playing for Exeter Schoolboys. He made his debut in August 1971 at the age of 17, and went on to make 107 appearances in all competitions during his six years at Home Park, scoring two goals. He spent time on loan with Exeter City during the 1976–77 season before joining Torquay United in 1977. He retired from the professional game two years later, and went on to play non-league football for Minehead. He later worked as a salesman in Exeter.

References

1953 births
Living people
Sportspeople from Exeter
Footballers from Devon
English footballers
Association football fullbacks
Plymouth Argyle F.C. players
Exeter City F.C. players
Torquay United F.C. players
English Football League players